Children's Park is a 2019 Indian Malayalam comedy film. It was directed by Shafi and written by Rafi. The film stars Vishnu Unnikrishnan, Manasa Radhakrishnan, Sharafudheen, Dhruvan, Sowmya Menon, and Gayathri Suresh. It was produced by Roopesh Omana and Milan Jaleel under Cochin Films.

Plot
Rishi and Jerry are good friends who trust each other immensely and decide to run away from their respective homes. Eventually, Rishi's father dies, and the desire to inherit his father's wealth starts to develop in his mind. Unfortunately, Rishi does not get any of the wealth, as his father signs everything away to an orphanage named "Children's Park." An older man, Govindan, owned the orphanage. Rishi, longing for his father's wealth, decides to travel towards the orphanage with his best friend, Jerry. To their surprise, they discover that the orphanage is non-functional. To get the money, the orphanage has to be functioning well, so they contact Lenin, a political party worker, and befriend him. The three of them together rescue kidnapped children on the road by disguising themselves as the police. As the three friends don't have any money to buy things for the orphans, they plot to cheat and win money from a political leader named Kora. One night, Viji, a maiden, comes and leaves her baby in front of the orphanage's gate only to discover that the next evening she would have to go back to the orphanage to work as a nanny. As time passes, the events start to heat up among the characters, and the story becomes entertaining, tragic, and comedic.

Cast
 Sharafudheen as Lenin
 Manasa Radhakrishnan as Prarthana
 Balachandran Chullikkadu as Rishi's Father
 Sowmya Menon as Neena
 Hareesh Kanaran as Dinakaran
 Joy Mathew as Govindan
 Raffi as Adv. Thomas Augustine
 Dhruvan as Rishi
 Shivaji Guruvayoor as Kora
 Dini Daniel as Jerry's mother
 Ponnamma Babu as Korah's Wife
 Sreejith Ravi as S.P Alex IPS
 Noby Marcose
 Vishnu Unnikrishnan as Jerry
 Aruldoss
 Kollam Sudhi
 Gayathri Suresh as Viji
 Basil

References

Sources

External links
 

2019 films